Aamir Abdul Gani (born 27 August 1996) is a first-class cricketer from India.

He was a part India Squad for 2014 ICC Under-19 Cricket World Cup.

References

External links
 
 

1996 births
Living people
Indian cricketers
Bengal cricketers